Lenka Němečková (born 20 April 1976) is a Czech former professional tennis player.

Němečková was born in Brno. She has a career-high WTA singles ranking of 72, achieved on 12 January 1998. She also has a career-high WTA doubles ranking of 85 achieved on 28 April 1997. Němečková has won one WTA doubles title, and four ITF singles titles and 16 ITF doubles titles.

Němečková (married Janoušková) retired from professional tennis in 2006.

WTA career finals

Singles: 1 (1 runner-up)

Doubles: 3 (1 title, 2 runner-ups)

ITF finals

Singles (4–9)

Doubles (16–15)

External links
 
 

1976 births
Living people
Sportspeople from Brno
Czech female tennis players